The Fuentenueva rugby field is situated within the sports facilities of the same name owned by  University of Granada. In this field are played all the home matches of the C.D. Universidad de Granada Rugby teams, as well as the university selection teams and other teams of the academic entity.

Situated between Calle Rector Martín Ocete, Avenida de Severo Ochoa and the university walkways Profesor Juan Ossorio of Granada, is currently, the only rugby-specific stadium in the entire Granada province. With an north–south orientation, it has a capacity of circa 1.000 spectators and it has an only stand at the north end. However, the affluence of fans in both sides of the field is frequent.

Frequently the demolition of the field as part of several projects of expansion of a nearby RENFE station, however, during its last substantial refurbishment as a consequence of the implantation of a train line, which respects the current field position.

See also 

 Universidad de Granada Rugby
 Rugby en España
 División de Honor B de Rugby

References

External links 

 C.D.U. Granada Rugby official page
 Center of Sports Activities of the University of Granada

Sport in Granada
Buildings and structures in Granada
Rugby union stadiums in Spain
Sports venues in Andalusia